A sub-national transport body (STBs) is a type of ad hoc statutory transport governance organisation in the United Kingdom. They are intended to provide strategic transport governance at a much larger scale than existing local transport authorities, by grouping councils together. 

In 2016 the Local Transport Act 2008 was amended by the Cities and Local Government Devolution Act 2016 to allow the creation of sub-national transport bodies. The first such body created was Transport for the North. Typically a sub-national transport body exists in a shadow form before being put on a statutory footing by secondary legislation. Sub-national transport bodies produce transport strategies for their areas.

Current sub-national transport bodies are:
England's Economic Heartland (pre-statutory basis)
Midlands Connect (pre-statutory basis)
Transport East (pre-statutory basis)
Transport for the North (statutory basis since 1 April 2018)
Transport for the South East (pre-statutory basis, formal application submitted)
Western Gateway (pre-statutory basis)
Peninsula Transport (pre-statutory basis) - Cornwall, Devon, Plymouth, Somerset and Torbay

Additionally there have been proposals for sub-national transport bodies covering West Anglia and the South West.

References

Local government in England
 
Transport in England